Nick McArdle is an Australian TV sports presenter with a career spanning 20 years in the media industry. 

He was previously weekend sports presenter for Seven News in Sydney for a number of years.

Career
McArlde began his career in sports reporting on country television at Port Pirie, South Australia, before moving into radio on the Austereo network in Adelaide, Brisbane and Sydney.

He then presented the sport report on the (now cancelled) Seven Late News, and hosted Sunrise as a fill-in presenter. Over the summer of 2005, McArdle presented Seven Morning News as a fill-in presenter.

Nick started his career on radio with the Austereo Network reading news in Adelaide, Brisbane and Sydney before moving to television in 1995.

McArdle has covered the Olympic Games in Sydney and Athens, the Winter Olympics in Turin, and the Commonwealth Games in Manchester and Melbourne, and was a regular on Australia's overseas cricket tours, including the Ashes of 2001 and the 2003 World Cup.

Over the years, he has also covered the 1999 World Alpine Ski Championships in Vail, Australia's Davis Cup semi-final loss to Argentina in Buenos Aires in 2006, the World Athletics Championships in Seville, the World Swimming Championships in Barcelona and the Pan Pacific Swimming Championships in Fukuoka.

He finished with the Seven Network in November 2006.

McArdle worked at Fox Sports until 2020 where he was a senior news presenter and tennis and cricket host. He hosted Fox Sports' coverage of the US Open from Flushing Meadows and was the in-studio presenter of Australia's overseas cricket tours, beginning with the tour of India in October/November 2008.

He hosted the first two tests of the 2009 Ashes series with former Australian cricketers Mark Waugh and Damien Fleming before travelling to England to host the final three tests and report for Fox Sports News.

He also fronted the rugby coverage for Fox Sports until the end of 2019 when he was axed due to budget cuts. His rugby reportage was described by Malcolm Knox as "knowledgeable, calm, even-handed". 

In 2020 he launched the podcast "The Playmakers’ Playbook".

In November 2020, McArdle joined the Nine Network covering rugby broadcasting.

McArdle is also a public speaker.

References

External links
 Fox Sports News

Australian television journalists
Living people
Journalists from Sydney
Seven News presenters
Australian sports journalists
Year of birth missing (living people)